Total Parco Pakistan Limited, stylized as TOTAL PARCO, is a Pakistani oil marketing company which is a subsidiary of French company Total S.A. The company is based in Lahore, Pakistan.

Company overview 
It was founded in 2002 as a joint venture between Pak-Arab Refinery (PARCO) and Total S.A.

Total Parco Pakistan Ltd. has 800 petrol pumps. Whereas Cnergyico has 982 petrol pumps, the State-owned Pakistan State Oil Co. has 3,500 petrol pumps and Shell Pakistan Ltd. has 766 petrol pumps.

History
In 2013, the company announced a plan to acquire 438 petrol stations of Chevron Corporation Pakistan.

References

TotalEnergies
Pakistani subsidiaries of foreign companies
Oil and gas companies of Pakistan
Energy companies established in 2002
2002 establishments in Pakistan
Companies based in Lahore
Privately held companies of Pakistan